Myristica gigantea is a species of plant in the family Myristicaceae. It is a tree found in Sumatra, Peninsular Malaysia and Borneo.

References

gigantea
Trees of Sumatra
Trees of Peninsular Malaysia
Trees of Borneo
Near threatened plants
Taxonomy articles created by Polbot